Pterostichus nigrita is a species of ground beetle native to Europe.

References

Pterostichus
Beetles described in 1790
Beetles of Europe